Nana Yaw Nkrumah born in Accra, professionally known as Dr Ray Beat is a Ghanaian record producer and sound engineer , who produces music ranging from Afrobeat, Hip hop, Hiplife, Azonto, Dancehall and Afropop. He also produced for Guru, Kwaw Kese, Kofi Kinaata and more.

Early life
Dr Ray Beat was born in Accra, raised and started his education at Agona Ododen in the Breman Asikuma District.

Career
He started working as a record producer officially in 2008. He has since worked with and produced several Ghanaian artistes such as Atumpan and Kofi Kinaata. He was nominated for Producer of the Year at the 2016 Vodafone Ghana Music Awards for his production on Atom's 2015 hit song "Yewo Krom".

Discography

Accolades

References

External links
 

Ghanaian record producers
Living people
Year of birth missing (living people)